Daniel Mahoney may refer to:
Daniel A. Mahoney (1849–1893), Wisconsin Democratic legislator from Kenosha County
Daniel O. Mahoney (1854–1944), Wisconsin Republican legislator from Vernon County
J. Daniel Mahoney (1931–1996), New York Conservative politician and judge